The 1906 Targa Florio was the inaugural running of the Targa Florio, an open road endurance automobile race held in the mountains of Sicily near Palermo. Founded by wealthy Sicilian wine producer, Vincenzo Florio, it was held at Madonie on 6 May 1906 and run over 3 laps of the 92.473 mile circuit, totalling 277.42 miles. 

The entry list was badly affected by a dock strike in Genoa but the race was won by the Italian driver Alessandro Cagno in an Itala.

Results

See also 
1907 Targa Florio

References

Targa Florio
Targa Florio
Targa Florio